The London Borough of Redbridge, one of the northern peripheral London boroughs, has within its boundaries parts of two large open spaces: Epping Forest and Wanstead Flats. Apart from many smaller parks, gardens and sports grounds, the following are the main open spaces in Redbridge:
 Claybury Woods and Park
 Epping Forest – portions near Woodford (also Wanstead Park, see below)
 Hainault Forest Country Park: 
 Hainault Lodge Nature Reserve: 
 Fairlop Waters: an open space with two lakes and a golf course, at Fairlop
 Goodmayes Park
 Loxford Park
 Seven Kings Park
 Roding Valley Park
 South Park, Ilford  
 Valentines Park, Ilford: 
 Wanstead Flats
 Wanstead Park (with lakes) and the Wanstead Golf Course

Fairlop Waters Country Park is one of 11 parks throughout Greater London chosen to receive money for redevelopment by a public vote, in 2009. The park received £400,000 towards better footpaths, more lighting, refurbished public toilets and new play areas for children.

The parks are patrolled by the Redbridge Community Police Team.

References

External links
 Guide to parks and open spaces in Redbridge
 Nature conservation in Redbridge